A prolactin modulator is a drug which affects the hypothalamic–pituitary–prolactin axis (HPP axis) by modulating the secretion of the pituitary hormone prolactin from the anterior pituitary gland. Prolactin inhibitors suppress and prolactin releasers induce the secretion of prolactin, respectively.

Prolactin inhibitors
Prolactin inhibitors are mainly used to treat hyperprolactinemia (high prolactin levels). Agonists of the dopamine D2 receptor such as bromocriptine and cabergoline are able to strongly suppress pituitary prolactin secretion and thereby decrease circulating prolactin levels, and so are most commonly used as prolactin inhibitors. D2 receptor agonists that are described as prolactin inhibitors include the approved medications bromocriptine, cabergoline, lisuride, metergoline, pergolide, quinagolide, and terguride and the never-marketed agent lergotrile. Other dopamine agonists and dopaminergic agents, for instance levodopa (L-DOPA), can also inhibit prolactin secretion. Antiestrogens such as aromatase inhibitors and  analogues are also able to inhibit the secretion of prolactin, though not nearly as robustly as D2 receptor agonists, and as such, they are not usually used as prolactin inhibitors.

Prolactin releasers
Whereas D2 receptor agonists suppress prolactin secretion, dopamine D2 receptor antagonists like domperidone and metoclopramide have the opposite effect, strongly inducing the pituitary secretion of prolactin, and are sometimes used as prolactin releasers, for instance to correct hypoprolactinemia (low prolactin levels) in the treatment of lactation failure. When such drugs are used not for the purpose of inducing prolactin secretion, increased prolactin levels may be unwanted, and can result in various side effects including mammoplasia (breast enlargement), mastodynia (breast pain/tenderness), galactorrhea (inappropriate or excessive milk production/secretion), gynecomastia (breast development in males), hypogonadism (low sex hormone levels), amenorrhea (cessation of menstrual cycles), reversible infertility, and sexual dysfunction. Indirect dopaminergic agents such as levodopa can also suppress prolactin levels. Other prolactin releasers besides D2 receptor antagonists include estrogens (e.g., estradiol), progestogens (e.g., progesterone), thyrotropin-releasing hormone and analogues (e.g., protirelin, taltirelin), and vasoactive intestinal peptide. Serotonergic agents such as serotonin precursors (e.g., tryptophan), serotonin reuptake inhibitors, serotonin releasing agents (e.g., fenfluramine, MDMA), monoamine oxidase inhibitors, and serotonin receptor agonists have also been associated with increases in prolactin levels.

References

External links
 

 
Breastfeeding